Liath ("grey") is a restaurant in Blackrock, County Dublin, Ireland. It is a fine dining restaurant that was awarded one Michelin star for 2020. It won a second star in 2022.

The head chef is Damien Grey. It is the successor to Heron and Grey, which stood on the same site between 2015 and 2019.

Awards
 Michelin star: since 2020
 Michelin TWO star: since 2022

See also
List of Michelin starred restaurants in Ireland

References

External links

Michelin Guide starred restaurants in Ireland
Blackrock, Dublin
Restaurants in Dún Laoghaire–Rathdown
Irish companies established in 2019